Major-General John Moyle (died 3 November 1738) was an officer of the British Army.

Biography
Moyle entered the Army on 4 January 1696 as a captain in the Royal Regiment of Ireland. He served with reputation under the Duke of Marlborough, and was present at the Battle of Blenheim. On 12 April 1706 he was made lieutenant-colonel of Colonel Roger Townshend's newly raised regiment of infantry, and on 13 April 1707 he was promoted to the brevet rank of colonel in the Army. At the peace of Utrecht in 1713 his regiment was disbanded, and he was placed on half-pay, but in 1715 he was made lieutenant-colonel of Colonel William Newton's Regiment of Dragoons. Colonel Moyle was advanced to the rank of brigadier-general on 13 March 1727. On 14 May 1732 King George II conferred the colonelcy of the 36th Regiment of Foot on Brigadier-General Moyle, who was promoted to the rank of major-general on 5 November 1735. On 27 June 1737 he was removed to the 22nd Regiment of Foot. Major-General Moyle died on 3 November 1738.

References
 pp. 114-115.

1738 deaths
British Army generals
British military personnel of the War of the Spanish Succession
Royal Irish Regiment (1684–1922) officers
Cheshire Regiment officers
36th Regiment of Foot officers
Year of birth unknown